Paul Félix Vincensini (30 April 1896, in Bastia – 9 August 1978, in La Ciotat)
was a French mathematician.

In 1927, he wrote his dissertation Sur trois types de congruences rectilignes at the University of Toulouse.
In 1945, working as a Professor at the University of Besançon, he was awarded the Charles Dupin Prize of the French Academy of Sciences, for his work in higher geometry.
In 1949, he got the Prix de la Pensée Française. 
In the same year, he went to Marseille University.
He retired in 1967, but still accepted presidency of a symposium of the Florence Institute for Pure and Applied Mathematical Sciences in 1978.

Selected works

References

1896 births
1978 deaths
French mathematicians